The 2012 SEABA Cup is the qualifying event in the SEABA for the 2012 FIBA Asia Cup. The games were held from July 3 to July 7 in Chiang Mai, Thailand. The Philippines swept all of their assignments to clinch the lone spot for SEABA region.

Round robin

Final standings

Awards

References

2012
International basketball competitions hosted by Thailand
2012–13 in Asian basketball
2012–13 in Philippine basketball
2012–13 in Malaysian basketball
2012–13 in Indonesian basketball
2012–13 in Singaporean basketball
2012–13 in Thai basketball